Brachodes flavescens is a moth of the family Brachodidae. It is found in Italy.

References

Moths described in 1919
Brachodidae
Moths of Europe